Ike Ibrahim Shorunmu (born 16 October 1967) is a former Nigerian football goalkeeper.

Career
Shorunmu was born in Lagos.  After a few years in Nigeria he moved to play in Switzerland, and made his mark there. He was bought by Turkish club Beşiktaş J.K. in 1999 for $2,400,000 — but they released him as they thought he spent too much time with the national team. Shorunmu later played for other Swiss and Turkish clubs.

International career
He has been the first-choice goalkeeper of the national team and played at the 2002 FIFA World Cup. Shorunmu was brought into the Nigerian national team by coach Clemens Westerhof in 1992.

Coaching career
Shorunmu has recently served as the national team goalkeeper coach as well as for Enyimba F.C. In 2010 Shorunmu was hired in the same capacity for Heartland F.C.

References

External links
Nigerian Players

1967 births
Living people
Sportspeople from Lagos
Association football goalkeepers
Nigerian footballers
Yoruba sportspeople
Nigerian expatriate footballers
1995 King Fahd Cup players
2002 FIFA World Cup players
1992 African Cup of Nations players
2000 African Cup of Nations players
2002 African Cup of Nations players
FC Basel players
FC Zürich players
Nigeria international footballers
Samsunspor footballers
Beşiktaş J.K. footballers
FC Luzern players
Shooting Stars S.C. players
Süper Lig players
SC Young Fellows Juventus players
Swiss Super League players
Expatriate footballers in Switzerland
Expatriate footballers in Turkey
Nigerian expatriate sportspeople in Switzerland
Nigerian expatriate sportspeople in Turkey